The International Skydiving Commission (ISC) of the Fédération Aéronautique Internationale (FAI) conducts the FAI's parachuting and skydiving activities, particularly the World Records and International Competitions. The commission was formerly known as the International Parachuting Commission, and changed its name on 6 December 2019, at the FAI General Conference in Lausanne.

References

External links
 
 Old International Parachuting Commission website

Parachuting organizations
Organisations based in Lausanne